Tun Dr Lim Chong Eu Expressway or Federal Route 3113, is an expressway in Penang, Malaysia, that connects the city of George Town to Batu Maung. This  expressway stretches along the eastern coast of Penang Island. It was erected on 7 December 2010 in honour of the former Penang's second chief minister and also the 'Architect of Modern Penang', Tun Dr Lim Chong Eu who died on 24 November that year. There are two sections of the expressway, the Jelutong Expressway and Bayan Lepas Expressway.

Route background
The Kilometre Zero is located at Batu Maung. The second elevated highway in Penang after Kuala Lumpur and Bayan Baru was constructed at Bayan Lepas Expressway here. This long flyover will be linking the new Penang Bridge in the south straight away to Bayan Baru for skipping traffic jams.

The underpass under it is used to travel along Bayan Lepas industrial area.

History
The pioneer route for the expressway was constructed on 1983 during the Penang Bridge was built and was completed in 1985. Later, the expressway was extended northwards as the Jelutong Expressway, and southwards as the Bayan Lepas Expressway.

On 7 December 2010, after former second Penang chief minister Lim Chong Eu died on 24 November 2010, the Penang state government renamed the expressway Tun Dr Lim Chong Eu Expressway in his honour.

Features
At most sections, the Federal Route 3113 was built under the JKR R5 road standard, allowing maximum speed limit of up to 90 km/h.

There is one overlap: Jalan Tengku Kudin–Gelugor-Penang Bridge:  Penang Bridge

There are sections with motorcycle lanes.

List of interchanges

Jelutong Expressway

Bayan Lepas Expressway

References

Malaysian Federal Roads
Highways in Malaysia
Expressways and highways in Penang
Northern Corridor Economic Region
Roads in Penang